The Shanghai Financial Post, or Shanghai jinrong bao, commonly known as Shanghai Financial News, was a Shanghai-based Chinese-language financial newspaper published in China. The newspaper was sponsored by the Shanghai Branch of the People's Bank of China (中国人民银行上海分行) on July 1, 1992.

History
Shanghai Financial Post was founded	July 1, 1992. It began publishing color newspapers in 2000. On January 1, 2020, the newspaper ceased publication.

References

Defunct newspapers published in China
Publications established in 1992
1992 establishments in China
Publications disestablished in 2020